Pyroderces argentata is a moth in the family Cosmopterigidae. It is found in the United Arab Emirates.

References

External links 
 Natural History Museum Lepidoptera generic names catalog

argentata
Moths described in 2010